Kalichankkottai is a village in the Pattukkottai taluk of Thanjavur district, Tamil Nadu, India.

Demographics 

As per the 2001 census, Kalichankkottai had a total population of 384 with 184 males and 200 females. The sex ratio was 1087. The literacy rate was 82.65.

References 

 

Villages in Thanjavur district